The Embassy of East Timor in London is the diplomatic mission of East Timor in the United Kingdom.

References

Diplomatic missions in London
Diplomatic missions of East Timor
East Timor–United Kingdom relations
Buildings and structures in the City of Westminster
Marylebone